Evangeline Parish is a parish located in the U.S. state of Louisiana. As of the 2020 census, the population was 32,350. The parish seat is Ville Platte.

History
The parish was created out of lands formerly belonging to St. Landry Parish in 1910. The majority of the area was originally settled by French Canadian colonists and former colonial marines (coureurs de bois) from such outposts as Fort Toulouse and Fort Kaskaskia and later included 19th-century French-speaking soldiers and immigrant families.

The early generations were born in colonial French colonies, which included the enormous Louisiana territory ('Upper and Lower' Louisiana) known as "la Nouvelle France", and later were born under Spanish rule.

Many people of Evangeline are primarily of French, English, and Spanish descent from Louisiana's colonial period. Examples of the French family names are Fontenot, Brignac, Ardoin, Bordelon, Vidrine, Courville, Gaspard, LaFleur, Chataignier, Dupre, Berza, Manuel, Ratelle, Fuselier, Landreneau, Andrepont, Guillory, Soileau, LeBas, and Gobert, among others. People of Spanish Canary Islands heritage (Isleños) can be observed to have settled in the Parish as well, bringing names like Aguillard, Casaneuva, De Soto, Ortego, Rozas, and Segura. Many English Americans as colonists came from the Eastern United States to settle in the newly purchased Louisiana Territory often married into Acadian families. Some prominent English surnames include Chapman, Kershaw, Young, Reed, Langley, Tate and Buller.

A few Acadians such as François Pitre and his wife settled the area between Evangeline and St. Landry parishes, preferring the rich pre-American and pre-Civil War era Cajun planter's lifestyle over that of the humble and isolated existence of their Acadiana cousins.

The parish was named Evangeline in honor of Henry Wadsworth Longfellow's narrative poem, Evangeline. It was from this poem that founding father Paulin Fontenot was to propose the namesake of "Evangeline" for this parish, allegedly foreseeing an emerging American tourism centered upon the Acadian saga. (See Ville Platte Gazette, Sept. 2010) In 19th-century American literature, she would gain popularity through Hollywood's interest, and thus began the embryonic 'Acadian-based' tourism which sprang up in St. Martinville. Evangeline Parish is mentioned in the Randy Newman song "Louisiana 1927", in which he described the Great Mississippi Flood which covered it with six feet of water.

Ville Platte, Louisiana, the seat of Evangeline Parish, was itself so named by one of Napoleon Bonaparte's former soldiers, Adjutant Major Marcellin Garand (1781-1852), of Savoy, France. (See Napoleon's Soldiers In America, by Simone de la Souchere-Delery, 1999).

Geography

Major highways
  Interstate 49
  U.S. Highway 190
  U.S. Highway 167
  Louisiana Highway 10
  Louisiana Highway 13
  Louisiana Highway 29

Adjacent parishes 
 Rapides Parish  (north)
 Avoyelles Parish  (northeast)
 St. Landry Parish  (east)
 Acadia Parish  (south)
 Allen Parish  (west)

National protected area
 Lacassine National Wildlife Refuge (part)

State parks
 Chicot State Park
 Louisiana State Arboretum

Demographics

2020 census

As of the 2020 United States census, there were 32,350 people, 12,172 households, and 7,739 families residing in the parish.

2010 census
As of the 2010 United States Census, there were 33,984 people living in the parish. 69.0% were White, 28.3% Black or African American, 0.3% Asian, 0.3% Native American, 1.0% of some other race and 1.1% of two or more races. 2.3% were Hispanic or Latino (of any race). 40.0% were of French, French Canadian or Cajun ancestry and 9.1% identified as having American ancestry.

2000 census
As of the census of 2000, there were 35,434 people, 12,736 households, and 9,157 families living in the parish.  The population density was 53 people per square mile (21/km2).  There were 14,258 housing units at an average density of 22 per square mile (8/km2).  The racial makeup of the parish was 70.42% White, 28.57% Black or African American, 0.23% Native American, 0.14% Asian, 0.01% Pacific Islander, 0.18% from other races, and 0.46% from two or more races.  1.04% of the population were Hispanic or Latino of any race. 25.71% reported speaking French or Cajun French at home, the highest percentage of any Louisiana parish.

There were 12,736 households, out of which 38.00% had children under the age of 18 living with them, 52.30% were married couples living together, 15.50% had a female householder with no husband present, and 28.10% were non-families. 25.80% of all households were made up of individuals, and 11.90% had someone living alone who was 65 years of age or older.  The average household size was 2.64 and the average family size was 3.19.

In the parish the population was spread out, with 29.60% under the age of 18, 9.60% from 18 to 24, 27.60% from 25 to 44, 20.40% from 45 to 64, and 12.80% who were 65 years of age or older.  The median age was 34 years. For every 100 females there were 99.40 males.  For every 100 females age 18 and over, there were 98.10 males.

The median income for a household in the parish was $20,532, and the median income for a family was $27,243. Males had a median income of $30,386 versus $16,793 for females. The per capita income for the parish was $11,432.  About 27.20% of families and 32.20% of the population were below the poverty line, including 39.10% of those under age 18 and 31.00% of those age 65 or over.

Education
Public Schools in Evangeline Parish are operated by the Evangeline Parish School Board.
 Bayou Chicot Elementary School (Grades PK-8) (Ville Platte)
 Chataignier Elementary School (Grades PK-8) (Chataignier)
 James Stephens Montessori School (Grades PK-6) (Ville Platte)
 Mamou Elementary School (Grades PK-4) (Mamou)
 Vidrine Elementary School (Grades PK-8) (Ville Platte)
 Ville Platte Elementary School (Grades PK-4) (Ville Platte)
 W. W. Stewart Elementary (Grades PK-4) (Basile)
 Basile High School (Grades 5–12) (Basile)
 Mamou High School (Grades 5–12) (Mamou)
 Pine Prairie High School (Grades 9–12) (Pine Prairie)
 Ville Platte High School (Grades 5–12) (Ville Platte)
 Evangeline Central School (Grades 4–12) (Ville Platte)

Evangeline Parish is also served by the Diocese of Lafayette with one school:
 Sacred Heart School (Grades K-12) (Ville Platte)

Additionally, Evangeline Parish is served by one unaffiliated private school:
 Christian Heritage Academy (Grade K) (Ville Platte)

Evangeline Parish is served by one institutions of higher education:
 South Louisiana Community College service area, C. B. Coreil Campus (Ville Platte

Communities

City 
 Ville Platte (parish seat and largest municipality)

Towns
 Basile
 Mamou

Villages
 Chataignier
 Pine Prairie
 Turkey Creek

Unincorporated areas

Census-designated places 
 Reddell
 Vidrine

Other unincorporated communities 
 Bayou Chicot
 Saint Landry
 Tate Cove
 Belaire Cove
 Beaver
 Lone Pine
 Lake Cove

Notable people
 Amédé Ardoin, Creole singer and Cajun accordion virtuoso
 Winston De Ville - noted genealogist and publisher of hundreds of articles and numerous books
 Eric LaFleur, lawyer and Senator and sponsor of several important bills and represented historic Senate Resolution #30
 Bernard LeBas, a Ville Platte pharmacist who has represented Evangeline and St. Landry parishes in the Louisiana House of Representatives since 2008
 Walter L. Lee - Evangeline Parish Clerk of Court, 1956-2012

Politics

See also
 National Register of Historic Places listings in Evangeline Parish, Louisiana

Sources
 Title: The Cajunization of French Louisiana: Forging a Regional Identity. Authors: Trepanier, Cecyle Source: Geographical Journal; Jul 91, Vol. 157 Issue 2, p161, 11p, 2 charts, 10 maps
 French, Cajun, Creole, Houma : a primer on francophone Louisiana / Carl A. Brasseaux.
 https://web.archive.org/web/20091026030323/http://geocities.com/old_time_time/many.htm
 A history of Evangeline : its land, its men and its women who made it a beautiful place to live, Robert Gahn, Sr. ; edited by Revon John Reed, Sr. Baton Rouge, LA : Claitor's, c 1972
 La Voix des Prairies, Evangeline Genealogical and Historical Society.
 Bonnes Nouvelles : good news about people, places and things in Evangeline Parish. Ville Platte, La. : Bonnes Nouvelles, 1993-
 Fort Toulouse : The French Outpost at the Alabamas on the Coosa, Gregory A. Thomas
 Louisiana's French Creole Culinary & Linguistic Traditions: Facts vs. Fiction Before And Since Cajunization, John laFleur II, Brian Costello w/ Dr. Ina Fandrich 2013
 Louisiana's Creole French People, Our Food, Language & Culture: 500 Years of Culture copyright 2014, John laFleur II

National Guard
The 1086th Transportation Company of the 165th CSS (Combat Service Support) Battalion resides in Ville Platte, Louisiana.  This unit belongs to the 139th RSG (regional support group).

References

External links
 Evangeline Parish School Board
 Evangeline Parish Tourism Commission
 City of Ville Platte
 Evangeline Parish Library
 Pascal Fuselier's articles
 Tournoi
Geology
 Snead, J., P. V. Heinrich, and R. P. McCulloh, 2002, Ville Platte 30 x 60 minute geologic quadrangle. Louisiana Geological Survey, Baton Rouge, Louisiana.

 
Louisiana parishes
Parishes in Acadiana
Acadiana
1910 establishments in Louisiana
Populated places established in 1910